The 1983 Italy rugby union tour of Canada and the United States was a series of matches played between June and July 1983 in Canada and the United States by Italy national rugby union team

Results
Scores and results list Italy's points tally first.

References

 Francesco Volpe, Valerio Vecchiarelli (Author), 2000 Italia in Meta, Storia della nazionale italiana di rugby dagli albori al Sei Nazioni, GS Editore (2000) 
 Francesco Volpe, Paolo Pacitti (Author), Rugby 2000, GTE Gruppo Editorale (1999)

Italy
tour
tour
tour
Italy national rugby union team tours
Rugby union tours of Canada
Rugby union tours of the United States